Limnetron is a genus of dragonflies in the family Aeshnidae. It consists of two species: Limnetron antarcticum , and Limnetron debile , though some experts speculate that there are additional, undiscovered species. They are found in forest streams in Paraguay, south-eastern Brazil, northern Argentina, and Peru.

References

Aeshnidae
Anisoptera genera